Trinity International University (TIU) is an evangelical Christian university headquartered in Deerfield, Illinois. It comprises Trinity College, Trinity Graduate School, a theological seminary (Trinity Evangelical Divinity School), a law school (Trinity Law School which is located in Santa Ana, California), and a camp called Timber-lee. the university also maintains campuses in North Lauderdale, Florida & Miami, Florida; the camp is located in East Troy, Wisconsin. TIU is the only university affiliated with Evangelical Free Church of America in the United States and enrolls about 2,700 students. On February 17, 2023 TIU announced it was moving the undergraduate program to online modalities only and will close the residential campus at the end of the Spring 2023 semester.

History 
Tracing its roots to 1897, TIU formed in the late 1940s as the result of a merger of two schools:

A school run by the Swedish Evangelical Free Church, founded in 1897 in Chicago, and incorporated as the Swedish Bible Institute of Chicago, then affiliated with Moody Bible Institute as the Swedish Department until 1925 when it became the Swedish Evangelical Free Church Bible Institute and Seminary.
A three-year Bible school, the Norwegian-Danish Bible Institute and Academy, founded in 1910 by the Norwegian-Danish Free Church, established in Rushford, Minnesota and later moving to Minneapolis and becoming Trinity Seminary and Bible Institute.

By 1949, the Minneapolis-based school moved to Chicago and the unified schools became known as Trinity Seminary and Bible College. In 1961 the school moved to a new campus in Bannockburn, Illinois, (Deerfield, Illinois postal address) and a year later was renamed Trinity Evangelical Divinity School (TEDS) and Trinity College. The school grew from an enrollment of 51 in 1961 to 1,400 in 1990.  In 1995, TEDS became part of Trinity International University, along with Trinity College in Deerfield, Illinois, and Trinity College in Miami, (formerly Miami Christian College which was obtained through a merger of the two institutions). In 1997 Trinity Law School, located in Santa Ana, California, was incorporated into Trinity International University and the Trinity Graduate School was founded.

In 2014, David S. Dockery was elected unanimously as the 15th president of Trinity. He was inaugurated in October of that year. Dockery has led the drive to establish a new strategic plan called Heritage & Hope: Trinity 2023, which outlines growth initiatives. Nicholas Perrin was elected as the 16th president in June 2019.

Approvals, accreditations and memberships 
Trinity International University is accredited by the Higher Learning Commission, The divinity school is also programmatically accredited by the Commission on Accrediting of the Association of Theological Schools in the United States and Canada (ATS).

TIU's law school, located in Santa Ana, California, is accredited by the Committee of Bar Examiners (CBE) of the State Bar of California (CALBAR). The normative nationwide USDE- and CHEA-approved accreditor of law schools is the American Bar Association (ABA).  Within the state of California, though, law schools are also accredited by CALBAR CBE, which is neither USDE- or CHEA-approved. Graduates of non-ABA accredited program are not recognized outside of the state of California.  TIU's Trinity Law School (Santa Ana campus only) is also included as part of TIU's regional accreditation by the USDE- and CHEA-approved NCA-HLC.

Trinity International University is exempt from the need to be approved to operate in Illinois by the Illinois Board of Higher Education (IBHE), which lists it as a "private NFP (not-for-profit) institution".  Its educational programs for K-12 teachers are approved by the Illinois State Board of Education (ISBE) so that TIU's graduates from said programs may obtain state-issued teaching credentials.  TIU is, further, approved by the Illinois Student Assistance Commission (ISAC) (formerly the Illinois State Scholarship Commission (ISSC)) Monetary Award Program (MAP) so that TIU's students may receive Illinois educational grants and scholarships.

Prior to 2003, TIU's athletic trainer program was accredited by the Commission on Accreditation of Allied Health Education Programs (CAAHEP); however in 2003 the accreditation of such programs was taken over by the Joint Review Committee on Athletic Training (JRC-AT); and in 2006 JRC-AT became the Committee for Accreditation of Athletic Training Education (CAATE). TIU's undergraduate athletic training educational program claims CAATE accreditation on its website.

TIU is also a member of the Council for Christian Colleges and Universities (CCCU), the Christian College Consortium (CCC), and the Christian Adult Higher Education Association (CAHEA).

Athletics
The Trinity International athletic teams are called the Trojans. The university is a member of the National Association of Intercollegiate Athletics (NAIA), primarily competing in the Chicagoland Collegiate Athletic Conference (CCAC) for most of its sports since the 1996–97 academic year; while its football program competes in the Mideast League of the Mid-States Football Association (MSFA). They are also a member of the National Christian College Athletic Association (NCCAA), primarily competing as an independent in the North Central Region of the Division I level.

Trinity International competes in nine intercollegiate varsity sports: Men's sports include baseball, basketball, football, soccer and volleyball; while women's sports include basketball, soccer, softball and volleyball.

Notable alumni 
Randall Balmer, Episcopal priest and John Phillips Professor in Religion, Dartmouth College
Ron Butler, television actor and comedian
Galen Carey, Vice President for Government Relations, National Association of Evangelicals
Lazarus Chakwera, sixth president of Malawi
Herb Coleman, American player of gridiron football
Paul Copan,  Christian theologian, analytic philosopher, apologist, and author. Currently professor at the Palm Beach Atlantic University and holds the endowed Pledger Family Chair of Philosophy and Ethics.
Norman Ericson, biblical scholar; Emeritus Professor at the Wheaton College
W. Kent Fuchs, President, University of Florida
Brian Hagedorn, attorney and judge; Justice of the Wisconsin Supreme Court
Karl Hankton, American player of gridiron football
Alan Heatherington, orchestra conductor and music director of several Chicago-area choirs and orchestras
Lincoln Hurst, biblical scholar, film historian; Emeritus Professor, University of California
Bill Hybels, founder of Willow Creek Community Church in Barrington, Illinois.
John Senyonyi, Vice Chancellor, Uganda Christian University
Jeffrey Neil Steenson, coordinator for Episcopal priests and laypeople seeking to become Roman Catholics within a personal ordinariate
Danny Yamashiro, chaplain at Massachusetts Institute of Technology (MIT), researcher on American presidents and childhood trauma, and media talk show host
Ravi Zacharias, Christian apologist

References

External links
 
 Official athletics website

 
1897 establishments in Illinois
Council for Christian Colleges and Universities
Deerfield, Illinois
Education in Lake County, Illinois
Educational institutions established in 1897
Evangelicalism in Illinois
Universities and colleges affiliated with the Evangelical Free Church of America
Liberal arts colleges in Illinois
Private universities and colleges in Illinois